Kirk Reynolds (born 20 November 1974) is a Canadian sports shooter. He competed in the men's double trap event at the 1996 Summer Olympics.

References

External links
 

1974 births
Living people
Canadian male sport shooters
Olympic shooters of Canada
Shooters at the 1996 Summer Olympics
Sportspeople from Saskatchewan
Commonwealth Games medallists in shooting
Commonwealth Games silver medallists for Canada
Pan American Games medalists in shooting
Pan American Games silver medalists for Canada
Shooters at the 1995 Pan American Games
Shooters at the 2006 Commonwealth Games
20th-century Canadian people
Medallists at the 2006 Commonwealth Games
People from Outlook, Saskatchewan